William A. Mercer (born February 13, 1926) is an American sportscaster, educator and author.  Originally from Muskogee, Oklahoma, he has retired to Durham, North Carolina after a long residence in Richardson, Texas. In 2002, he was inducted into the Texas Radio Hall of Fame.

Personal
Mercer's ships participated in five invasions: Marshall Islands, Guam, Leyte, Luzon and Okinawa. He is included in the list of notable surviving veterans of World War II. Mercer first attended college at Northeastern State College in Tahlequah, Oklahoma, after the war. He then earned a bachelor's degree from the University of Denver in 1949 and a master's degree from North Texas State University in Denton, Texas in 1966. Mercer's Granddaughter Emma Tiedemann is the play-by-play voice of the Portland Sea Dogs in Portland, Maine.

Career
Mercer is best known as a play-by-play radio announcer for baseball, football, basketball and wrestling.  He was also a news reporter for Dallas, Texas television station KRLD, covering the John F. Kennedy assassination in 1963. He and fellow reporters George Phenix, Wes Wise and Bob Huffaker wrote When the News Went Live about their experiences during that time.  Mercer also wrote,  Play-by-Play: Tales from a Sportscasting Insider, about his experiences in sportscasting. He enjoyed a stint as a sports anchor at KVIL radio station in Dallas-Fort Worth during the 1970s and 80s, alongside longtime morning host Ron Chapman. Mercer also spent over 35 years teaching new generations of sports broadcasters in the University of North Texas's Radio/TV Department. He was also recognized by the University of Texas at Dallas Athletic Department for his involvement with their live game broadcasts.

Play by Play
In his 60+ year career, Mercer provided play-by-play broadcasting for several minor league teams: First, the Muskogee Giants of the Class C Western Association, then the Dallas Rangers (Triple A baseball) from 1959 to 1964, and the Dallas-Fort Worth Spurs (Texas League baseball) from 1965 to 1971.  He then moved up to broadcast for major league baseball's Texas Rangers (major league baseball) in 1972 (with Don Drysdale) and Chicago White Sox in 1974.  Mercer also provided play-by-play for University of North Texas (known as North Texas State College until 1961, and North Texas State University from 1961 to 1988) football and basketball from 1959 to 1994. Mercer's first broadcasts for professional teams began with the Dallas Texans (American Football League) in 1960 with Charlie Jones, then for the Dallas Cowboys (National Football League) from 1966 to 1971. Initially, Mercer provided color commentary with Jay Randolph in 1965 for the Cowboys, then became the play-by-play announcer when Randolph moved to St. Louis the following year. In the 1980s, Mercer broadcast Southwest Conference football and basketball for Mutual Radio. In the 2000s, he assisted Mike Capps with play-by-play for Round Rock Express minor league baseball of the Texas League (currently in the Pacific Coast League,) and for three years with Scott Garner of the Frisco RoughRiders of the Texas League. While at KRLD-AM/TV in Dallas, he served seven years as color commentator for CBS Radio's annual broadcasts of the Cotton Bowl Classic college football game.  Mercer is also noted for calling the "Ice Bowl," the NFL championship game between the Dallas Cowboys and Green Bay Packers in 1967, along with the Cowboys' second Super Bowl appearance in January, 1972.

Wrestling
During his time at UNT, he called games involving Kevin Adkisson and Steve Williams, who both became professional wrestlers under the names Kevin Von Erich and Stone Cold Steve Austin, respectively. He also was the announcer in 1959 at UNT when Abner Haynes broke the color line in Texas and later became a star with the second incarnation of the Dallas Texans (American Football League). Mercer provided play-by-play announcing for the internationally acclaimed World Class Championship Wrestling (WCCW,) based in Dallas, from 1982 to 1987. Telecasts were originally shown on Dallas-Fort Worth station KXTX, Channel 39. Mercer became a wrestling announcer in the 1950s in Muskogee, Oklahoma during the course of broadcasting all area sports for local radio station KMUS.  By the late 1950s, Mercer had relocated to Dallas and began calling televised wrestling matches at the Dallas Sportatorium and in the studio for KRLD-TV (present day KDFW-TV,) Channel 4.  In early 1976, Mercer took over announcing duties for the long-running Saturday Night Wrestling program on KTVT, Channel 11, in Fort Worth, when original announcer Dan Coates retired.

Awards
 Texas Sports Hall of Fame (2020 inductee)
Texas Radio Hall of Fame (2002 inductee) 
 University of North Texas Athletic Department Hall of Fame
 Texas Baseball Ex-Pro's Baseball Hall of Fame 
 Oklahoma Sports Museum, Guthrie, Oklahoma: The Bill Teegins Award
 Texas Intercollegiate Press Association Hall of Fame, April 2009  
 University of Texas-Dallas Athletic Department Hall of Honor, 2011
 Namesake of the Bill Mercer Press Club at the University of North Texas's Apogee Stadium, awarded in 2012
Muskogee High Athletics Hall of Fame (2014)

Bibliography
 When the News Went Live: Dallas 1963. 
 Play-by-Play: Tales from a Sportscasting Insider

References

1926 births
American Football League announcers
American radio sports announcers
Chicago White Sox announcers
College basketball announcers in the United States
College football announcers
Dallas Cowboys announcers
Living people
Major League Baseball broadcasters
Minor League Baseball broadcasters
National Football League announcers
North Texas Mean Green football
Writers from Muskogee, Oklahoma
People from Richardson, Texas
Professional wrestling announcers
Sportswriters from Texas
Texas Rangers (baseball) announcers
United States Football League announcers
United States Navy personnel of World War II
United States Navy sailors